Russian Kaleidoscope is a weekly program for the Russian Community in Melbourne. The show includes local news, interviews and Russian Documentaries.

Content

Interviews
In the past the show has interviewed Russian immigrants to Australia and the Russian Scout Movement in Melbourne.

Concerts and Presentations
There are vary programs from the concerts and presentations conducted in Melbourne

Regular Segments
There are regular segments like: "Australian Law with Oleg Bydanov", "Let's Talk Art", "Trip to Inner-self", "Life Stories".

Documentaries
The program shows documentaries sourced from Russia.

References

External links

Australian community access television shows
Television shows set in Victoria (Australia)